Tübingen West station was opened in 1910 and is located in the west of the city of Tübingen in the German state of Baden-Württemberg. It was opened in 1910 with the  Ammer Valley Railway (Ammertalbahn).

The station building is no longer used for railway operations. The station consists of two tracks around an island platform. It is necessary to cross over an unprotected passenger level crossing to reach the platform.

Currently, the former station building houses a Tanztheater ("dance theatre") with a display space and a cocktail bar and beer garden.

History

Tübingen West station was opened as the last station on the Ammer Valley Railway in 1910. The station precinct consisted of a stately entrance building, a freestanding goods shed, crossing tracks with side platforms, head and side loading ramps, a weighbridge (32 tonnes), a small loading crane, a mechanical dispatcher signal box and several private sidings.

After the takeover of the operation by the Zweckverband ÖPNV im Ammertal ("communal association for public transport in the Ammer valley", ZÖA), the mechanical signal box was decommissioned in 1999, the freight facilities were abandoned and an island platform was built between the main tracks, which can be reached via a level crossing at the former station building. The remote-controlled points were replaced by resetting points, supported by train-controlled entry and distant colour light signals. The station building and goods shed still exist but are used for private purposes.

Regional services
One rail service serves the station as follows:

References

Railway stations in Germany opened in 1910
Buildings and structures in Tübingen
Railway stations in Baden-Württemberg